Scotobleps is a monotypic frog genus in the family Arthroleptidae; its sole species is Scotobleps gabonicus, sometimes known as the Gaboon forest frog or Gabon forest frog. It is found in eastern  Nigeria, western and southwestern Cameroon, Equatorial Guinea, western Gabon, western Republic of the Congo, and western Democratic Republic of the Congo. Its range could extend into the Cabinda Enclave of Angola.

Description
The syntype(s) measured  in snout–vent length. The head is rather large, as long as broad. The snout is obtusely pointed with a feeble canthus rostralis. The eyes are large. The fingers and toes are moderately elongated, with slightly swollen tips and very strong subarticular tubercles. The toes are half-webbed. Skin is smooth or with small flat warts on the back. The dorsum is olive-brown with small, blackish spots. There is a dark cross-band between the eyes and the upper lip has blackish vertical bars; the one below the anterior third of the eye is extending onto the lower lip. Limbs have dark cross-bars. The venter is white.

Habitat and conservation
Scotobleps gabonicus is a common species at low altitudes, living in lowland rainforests, including secondary forests. Breeding takes place in flowing water, preferably in wide, shallow streams with sandy banks but also in torrents. Loss of its forest habitat is causing population declines.

References

Arthroleptidae
Monotypic amphibian genera
Frogs of Africa
Amphibians of Cameroon
Amphibians of the Democratic Republic of the Congo
Amphibians of Equatorial Guinea
Amphibians of Gabon
Fauna of Nigeria
Amphibians of the Republic of the Congo
Amphibians of West Africa
Amphibians described in 1900
Taxa named by George Albert Boulenger
Taxonomy articles created by Polbot